Just Walking, also known as Walking Vengeance, is a 2008 Spanish-Mexican crime thriller film directed and written by Agustín Díaz Yanes. Its cast stars Ariadna Gil, Diego Luna, Victoria Abril, Pilar López de Ayala, Elena Anaya, and José María Yazpik.
 

The film was nominated for eleven Goya awards, winning one (for Best Cinematography).

Synopsis
After a failed jewellery heist, Aurora Rodriguez (Ariadna Gil) is caught and sentenced to eight years in prison, while her three accomplices get away.  Aurora's sister, prostitute Ana (Elena Anaya), meets a powerful Mexican drug lord Felix (José María Yazpik) during a job and agrees to marry him.  While Paloma (Pilar López de Ayala) leverages her connections as a court secretary to influence a judge into reducing Aurora's sentence to four years, Gloria (Victoria Abril) joins Ana in Mexico and discovers that Felix has been brutally abusing Ana.

Just as Ana reveals to Gloria that she intends to get back at Felix by stealing all his money, Felix viciously beats Ana in a fit of rage and leaves her barely alive and hospitalized.  Paloma secures Aurora's release from prison and they join Gloria and Ana in Mexico, where the four women set Ana's plan in motion.  Meanwhile, Felix's right-hand man Gabriel (Diego Luna) has spent twenty years waiting to take revenge on his father, currently in prison for beating Gabriel's mother to death.  Though Gabriel begins developing suspicions towards what Aurora and her friends are planning, Felix's violent behavior causes him to question his unwavering loyalty to his childhood friend.

Awards and nominations

Won
Cinema Writers Circle Awards
Best Actress in a Leading Role (Ariadna Gil)

Goya Awards
Best Cinematography (Paco Femenia)

Nominated
Cinema Writers Circle Awards
Best Actor in a Leading Role (Diego Luna)
Best Actor in a Supporting Role (José María Yazpik)
Best Cinematography (Paco Femenia)
Best Director (Agustín Díaz Yanes)
Best Film
Best Screenplay – Original (Agustín Díaz Yanes)

Goya Awards
Best Actor in a Leading Role (Diego Luna)
Best Actor in a Supporting Role (José María Yazpik)
Best Actress in a Leading Role (Ariadna Gil)
Best Director (Agustín Díaz Yanes)
Best Film
Best Editing (José Salcedo)
Best Production Supervision (Rafael Cuervo and Mario Pedraza)
Best Screenplay – Original (Agustín Díaz Yanes)
Best Sound Pierre Gamet, Patrice Grisolet and Christophe Vingtrinier)
Best Visual Effects (Reyes Abades, Rafa Solorzano and Alejandro Vázquez)

See also 
 List of Spanish films of 2008

External links
 
 

2008 films
Spanish thriller films
2000s Spanish-language films
Mexican thriller films
Films directed by Agustín Díaz Yanes
2000s Mexican films
2000s Spanish films